Hyporhagus gilensis is a species of opossum beetle in the family Zopheridae.  It is found in North America.

Subspecies
 Hyporhagus gilensis californicus Freude, 1955
 Hyporhagus gilensis gilensis Horn, 1872
 Hyporhagus gilensis opuntiae Horn, 1872
 Hyporhagus gilensis texanus Linell, 1899

References

Further reading

 
 
 

Zopheridae
Beetles described in 1872